Sphodronotus is a genus of grasshoppers in the subfamily Calliptaminae, with species found in Iran.

Species 
The following species are recognised in the genus Sphodronotus:

 Sphodronotus cyclopterus (Uvarov, 1933)
 Sphodronotus grandis Popov, 1951

References 

Acrididae genera
Taxa named by Boris Uvarov